Floydia is a monotypic species of tree in the family Proteaceae native to Australia. It is a somewhat rare tree found only growing in the rainforests of southeastern Queensland and northern New South Wales. The sole species is Floydia praealta which is commonly known as the ball nut or possum nut.

The tree has a superficial resemblance to the closely related Macadamia and could be confused with them. The fruit of F. praealta is poisonous.

The species was formally described in 1862 by Victorian Government Botanist Ferdinand von Mueller based on plant material collected near the Clarence River in northern New South Wales and the Brisbane River in Queensland. In his publication Fragmenta Phytographiae Australiae   Mueller named the plant Helicia praealta. The species was transferred to the genus Macadamia in 1901 by Queensland Colonial Botanist Frederick Manson Bailey and then to Floydia in 1975 by Lawrie Johnson and Barbara Briggs.

References

External links
Description of plant, including pictures
Herbarium specimen at Royal Botanic Gardens Kew
Botanical illustration (Australian National Botanic Gardens)

Proteaceae
Flora of New South Wales
Flora of Queensland
Proteales of Australia
Vulnerable flora of Australia
Monotypic Proteaceae genera
Taxa named by Barbara G. Briggs
Taxa named by Lawrence Alexander Sidney Johnson
Endemic flora of Australia